Rana Zahid Tauseef is a Pakistani politician and businessman affiliated with the Pakistan Muslim League (N) party who has previously served as the mayor (Nazim) of Faisalabad, his hometown in Punjab, Pakistan.

Zahid has also been an elected member of the National Assembly of Pakistan in the past. His brother, Rana Asif Tauseef, is also a politician from PML (Q) who also served as State Minister for Privatization.

References

Living people
Faisalabad District
Mayors of Faisalabad
Pakistan Muslim League (N) politicians
People from Faisalabad
Politicians from Punjab, Pakistan
Punjabi people
Year of birth missing (living people)